Turnberry is a village 6 miles north of Girvan, in the civil parish of Kirkoswald, in the council area of South Ayrshire, Scotland. It has a golf centre called Turnberry which has 3 courses.  In 1991 it had a population of 149.

History 
The name "Turnberry" means "circular place".

References

External links

 

Villages in South Ayrshire